Muine is an audio player for the GNOME desktop environment which runs on Linux, Solaris, BSD and other UNIX-like systems. Muine is written in C# using Mono and Gtk#. The default backend is GStreamer framework but Muine can also use xine libraries.

Features 
A simple, intuitive user interface
Ogg Vorbis, FLAC and MP3 music playback support
Automatic album-cover fetching
Support for embedded ID3v2 album images
ReplayGain support
Support for multiple artist and performer tags per song
A system tray icon
Plugin support
Translations into many languages

See also

 Software audio players (free and open-source)

References
 Freshmeat project page for Muine
 https://git.gnome.org/browse/archive/muine/
 Free Agent: Picture Perfect and in Tune
 Seven Cool Mono Apps

Free audio software
Free media players
Linux media players
Software that uses Mono (software)
Audio player software that uses GTK
Free software programmed in C Sharp
Applications using D-Bus
Discontinued software
Software that uses GStreamer